Riasten is a lake in the municipality of Holtålen in Trøndelag county, Norway.

See also
List of lakes in Norway

References

Holtålen
Lakes of Trøndelag